Bhayangkara Football Club is an Indonesian professional football club based in Bekasi Regency, West Java, Indonesia. The club are linked to the Indonesian National Police, with many of their players serving as policemen. Even the name of the club is based on a police rank. They currently compete in the Liga 1, the highest level of football in Indonesia and won the title once in 2017.

History

A Persebaya Offspring (2010-2016)
Bhayangkara FC has a complicated history as it was a by-product of internal conflict in one of Indonesia's oldest clubs, Persebaya Surabaya. As the conflict was peaking in 2010, a rebel faction in Persebaya acquired Persikubar West Kutai, a second-tier club based in West Kutai on Borneo island, following the decision of the main faction to pull Persebaya out of the Indonesian Super League (ISL) and register it for the inaugural season of the Indonesian Premier League (IPL). The competition schism itself derived from a rift between the ISL organizers and the Football Association of Indonesia (PSSI). The rebel faction renamed Persikubar into Persebaya and moved its base to Surabaya so that the latter could still have a representation in the 2011 season of ISL, albeit in its second-tier.

When the Persebaya DU team managed to win promotion into the top-tier of ISL in 2013, the naming issue became a legal battle as another Persebaya was playing in the top-tier of IPL. In a span of a year (August 2015 to September 2016), this team changed names four times in order to circumvent legal challenges from different parties, including the notorious Persebaya ultras, known as Bonek. In April 2016, this team, known at that time as Surabaya United, merged with PS Polri, the amateur club of the Indonesian National Police, to obtain legal backing and create Bhayangkara Surabaya United.

A Police Team (2016-present)
On 10 September 2016, the Indonesian National Police became the main operator of the club and renamed it into its current identification, Bhayangkara FC, which no longer has any visible link to Persebaya Surabaya. Bhayangkara itself is a nickname for the Indonesian police, deriving from the name of the guardians of the ancient kingdom of Majapahit. That is why the club from 2016 onward was known as the Guardians. In November 2020, the club moved its base from Jakarta to Surakarta after failing to win support from football fans in the national capital who are already loyal to one of the most popular club in the country, Persija Jakarta, and planned to change its name to Bhayangkara Solo. However, the renaming plan was canceled according to PSSI in its 2021 annual congress.

First National Trophy
In 2017, Bhayangkara FC won the 2017 Liga 1 championship on a head-to-head decision, which was seen as controversial by football fans nationwide who preferred the runner-up Bali United, which had collected the same number of points. While the procedure was legal and both teams were made out of controversial mergers, fans considered Bhayangkara as an elitist creation of the police with no popular support while Bali United had won the hearts of the people in Bali. Despite the championship, Bhayangkara FC was unable to compete in the 2018 AFC Champions League as it was unable to obtain an AFC license; the AFC Champions League spot went to Bali United.

Colours and badges 
Bhayangkara FC's main colour is gold, which is associated with the golden badge of police officers. The golden badge is also clearly included at the top section of its logo.

Honours

Stadium
Bhayangkara FC played their home matches in stadiums in the Greater Jakarta conurbation and trained at the PTIK Stadium, a small stadium inside the Indonesian National Police higher learning centre in South Jakarta, for the 2017–2020 seasons. When they won the 2017 Liga 1 season, they used the Patriot Chandrabhaga Stadium in Bekasi, which is part of Greater Jakarta, along with Persija Jakarta.
For 2022–23 season, they use Wibawa Mukti Stadium as their homebase.

Supporters 

Bhayangkara's supporters are called Bhara Mania and the majority of them are linked to the Indonesian National Police. While the club has collected the best players in the league, it lacks loyal grassroots supporters who are uncomfortable with the police connections. The November 2020 plan to move to Surakarta. which is also known as Solo, was an attempt to win supporters. However, that plan was cancelled before the 2021 Liga 1 season after lukewarm reception from football fans in that city.

Sponsorship

The club is financially supported by a company owned by the police's traffic division. Sometimes, it can win external sponsorship but from state-owned enterprises, such as Bank BNI.

Players

Current squad

Out on loan

Staff

References

External links
  

 

 
Football clubs in West Java
Football clubs in Indonesia
Association football clubs established in 2010
2010 establishments in Indonesia